Funchalia is a genus of deep-water prawns of the family Penaeidae. Six species are currently recognised:
Funchalia danae Burkenroad, 1940
Funchalia meridionalis (Lenz & Strunck, 1914)
Funchalia sagamiensis Fujino, 1975
Funchalia taaningi Burkenroad, 1940
Funchalia villosa (Bouvier, 1905)
Funchalia woodwardi Johnson, 1868

Few specimens of Funchalia are present in museum collections, mostly due to the lack of sampling at the great depths where it lives. It probably has a cosmopolitan distribution.

The genus was erected in 1868, when James Yate Johnson erected it for the species Funchalia woodwardi, which he had collected off Madeira; the specific epithet commemorated Henry Woodward of the British Museum.

References

Penaeidae
Taxa named by James Yate Johnson